The Key West Literary Seminar is a writers' conference and festival held each January in Key West, Florida. It draws an international audience for readings, panel discussions, and workshops.

History
The Seminar was founded in 1983 by David Kaufelt and his wife Lynn Kaufelt, as a program operated by the Council for Florida Libraries. The inaugural event, known as the Key West Literary Tour and Seminar, consisted of readings, panel discussions, literary walking tours, and cocktail parties. This basic format remains unchanged. The current Executive Director is poet, writer and publisher Arlo Haskell.

In its early years, the Seminar focused on the literary history of Key West, a small subtropical town which has been home to Ernest Hemingway, Elizabeth Bishop, Wallace Stevens, Robert Frost, and Tennessee Williams, among others. Subsequent Seminars have been devoted to broader genres or literary themes.

In 1987, the Seminar incorporated as a 501(c)(3) tax-exempt corporation, run by a board of directors, with Lynn Kaufelt named as the executive director. In 1988, Monica Haskell became executive director. She was succeeded by Miles Frieden in 1995. Many well-known authors have served on the Seminar's board of directors, including Judy Blume, Harry Mathews, James Gleick, William Wright, Richard Wilbur, and John Malcolm Brinnin. An honorary board of directors has included popular singer Jimmy Buffett, former First Lady Barbara Bush, and writers Annie Dillard, Robert Stone, Alison Lurie, and Joy Williams.

The Seminar was formerly held at the Tennessee Williams Fine Arts Center at Florida Keys Community College on Stock Island. Since 1993, events have been held on Duval Street at the San Carlos Institute, a historic building whose construction was partly funded by the Republic of Cuba during the 1920s. The seminar begins each year with the John Hersey Memorial Address and features a series of receptions at notable Key West locations.

Through their website, the Seminar offers audio recordings of past events, biographies of past and forthcoming speakers, and information about Key West's literary history.

The seminar went on hiatus in 2021.

Key West Literary Seminar themes by year:

1983: Key West Literary Tour and Seminar
1984: Key West Literary Tour and Seminar
1985: Hemingway: A Moveable Feast
1986: Tennessee Williams in Key West
1987: Writers & Key West
1988: Whodunit? The Art & Tradition of Mystery Literature
1989: The American Short Story: A Renaissance
1990: New Directions in American Theatre
1991: Literature of Travel: A Sense of Place
1992: Literature and Film
1993: Poetry of Elizabeth Bishop
1994: Biography and Autobiography
1995: Journalism
1996: American Writers and The Natural World
1997: Literature in the Age of AIDS
1998: Once Upon A Time: Children's Literature in the Late 20th Century
1999: The American Novel
2000: The Memoir
2001: Science and Literature: Narratives of Discovery
2002: Spirit of Place
2003: The Beautiful Changes: Poetry
2004: Crossing Borders: The Immigrant Voice in American Literature
2005: Humor
2006: The Literature of Adventure, Travel, and Discovery
2007: Wondrous Strange: Mystery, Intrigue, and Psychological Drama
2008: New Voices: Where Have We Been? Where Are We Going?
2009: Historical Fiction and The Search for Truth
2010: Clearing the Sill of the World: 60 Years of American Poetry
2011: The Hungry Muse: an exploration of food in literature
2012: Yet Another World: Literature of the Future
2013: Writers on Writers
2014: The Dark Side: Mystery, Crime, and the Literary Thriller
2015: How the Light Gets In: Literature of the Spirit
2016: Shorts: Stories, Essays, and Other Briefs
2017: Revealing Power: The Literature of Politics
2018: Writers of the Caribbean
2019: Under the Influence: Archetype & Adaptation from Homer to the Multiplex
2020: Reading Between the Lines: Sport & Literature
2022: A Seminar Named Desire (planned)

See also
 Florida literature
List of writers' conferences

References
"In Key West: the Writer as a Star," by Jane O'Reilly for TIME, Feb. 06, 1984
"Viewing AIDS Writings Through the Prism of Hope," by Dinitia Smith for The New York Times, Jan. 13, 1997
"Key West literary seminar opens amid literary fog"
A Literary Adventure
"Right on Key"
Frommer's South Florida

External links 
Key West Literary Seminar website
L I T T O R A L: the journal of the Key West Literary Seminar
KWLS Audio Archives

American writers' organizations
Culture of Key West, Florida
Festivals in Florida
Recurring events established in 1983
Writers' conferences
Literary
Literary festivals in the United States
1983 establishments in Florida